The 2021 Seattle Storm season is the franchise's 22nd season in the Women's National Basketball Association (WNBA). Due to ongoing renovations at the Climate Pledge Arena, the Storm played their home games at the Angel of the Winds Arena in Everett, Washington.

On May 30, 2021, head coach Dan Hughes announced his retirement; the Storm named associate head coach Noelle Quinn as his permanent replacement.

The Storm started the season with a finals rematch against the Las Vegas Aces.  They split the series at home, 1–1.  The rest of the opening month went smoother for the team, as that would be their only loss in May.  Two of their wins game in overtime as well.  The strong start continued into June, with the team winning their first two games of the month to extend their winning streak to six games.  That streak was snapped on June 6, with a one point loss to Dallas.  A five game winning streak followed the loss, but it was broken by the Storm losing their last two games of June to finish the month 7–3.  The team won four of their five games in July, with their only loss coming away against Phoenix.  They took a 16–5 record into the Olympic break.

The first game back from the Olympic break was the inaugural Commissioner's Cup Final, which the Storm won. The game was a dominating 79-57 victory over the Connecticut Sun. Breanna Stewart was named MVP of the game.  However, she would not play in their next two games, which the Storm would both lose.  The team turned their streak around with two wins, but they were followed by two losses, to give the Storm a 2–5 record in August.  September proved to be a better month as the team won three of their four games to finish the season with a 21–11 record.

Their record earned them the fourth seed in the 2021 WNBA Playoffs, which gave them a bye into the Second Round. The Storm hosted the Phoenix Mercury and lost 80–85 in overtime; Stewart did not play in the game.

Transactions

WNBA Draft

Trades and roster changes

Roster

Game log

Preseason 

|- style="background:#cfc;"
| 1
| May 8
| @ Phoenix
| W 88–71
| Ezi Magbegor (17)
| Ezi Magbegor (7)
| Jordin Canada (6)
| Phoenix Suns Arena1,985
| 1–0
|- style="background:#cfc;"
| 2
| May 10
| Phoenix
| W 103–93
| K. WilliamsDupree (12)
| Stephanie Talbot (5)
| Sue Bird (7)
| Angel of the Winds Arena
| 2–0

Regular season

|- style="background:#cfc;"
| 1
| May 15
| Las Vegas
| W 97–83
| Breanna Stewart (28)
| Breanna Stewart (13)
| Sue Bird (8)
| Angel of the Winds Arena1,031
| 1–0
|- style="background:#fcc;"
| 2
| May 18
| Las Vegas
| L 80–96
| Breanna Stewart (26)
| Ezi Magbegor (13)
| Sue Bird (5)
| Angel of the Winds Arena1,001
| 1–1
|- style="background:#cfc;"
| 3
| May 20
| @ Minnesota
| W 90–78
| Jewell Loyd (23)
| Breanna Stewart (7)
| Sue Bird (8)
| Target Center1,934
| 2–1
|- style="background:#cfc;"
| 4
| May 22
| @ Dallas
| W 100–97 (OT)
| Breanna Stewart (36)
| Breanna Stewart (11)
| Jewell Loyd (6)
| College Park Center1,491
| 3–1
|- style="background:#cfc;"
| 5
| May 25
| Connecticut
| W 87–90 (OT)
| Sue Bird (21)
| Breanna Stewart (12)
| Jewell Loyd (5)
| Angel of the Winds Arena1,011
| 4–1
|- style="background:#cfc;"
| 6
| May 28
| Minnesota
| W 82–72
| Breanna Stewart (15)
| Breanna Stewart (8)
| BirdLoydPrince (5)
| Angel of the Winds Arena1,332
| 5–1

|- style="background:#cfc;"
| 7
| June 1
| Indiana
| W 88–73
| Breanna Stewart (28)
| Mercedes Russell (11)
| Sue Bird (8)
| Angel of the Winds Arena1,215
| 6–1
|- style="background:#cfc;"
| 8
| June 4
| Dallas
| W 105-102 (OT)
| Jewell Loyd (25)
| RussellStewart (9)
| Sue Bird (10)
| Angel of the Winds Arena1,467
| 7–1
|- style="background:#fcc;"
| 9
| June 6
| Dallas
| L 67–68
| Jewell Loyd (25)
| BirdStewart (7)
| Sue Bird (5)
| Angel of the Winds Arena1,930
| 7–2
|- style="background:#cfc;"
| 10
| June 9
| @ Atlanta
| W 95–71
| Jewell Loyd (18)
| Breanna Stewart (9)
| Sue Bird (6)
| Gateway Center Arena1,014
| 8–2
|- style="background:#cfc;"
| 11
| June 11
| @ Atlanta
| W 86–75
| Jewell Loyd (20)
| Breanna Stewart (13)
| Sue Bird (7)
| Gateway Center Arena1,405
| 9–2
|- style="background:#cfc;"
| 12
| June 13
| @ Connecticut
| W 89–66
| Breanna Stewart (22)
| Breanna Stewart (9)
| Breanna Stewart (5)
| Mohegan Sun Arena2,248
| 10–2
|- style="background:#cfc;"
| 13
| June 15
| @ Indiana
| W 87–70
| Breanna Stewart (20)
| Breanna Stewart (12)
| Jordin Canada (6)
| Indiana Farmers ColiseumNo Fans
| 11–2
|- style="background:#cfc;"
| 14
| June 17
| @ Indiana
| W 79–69
| Breanna Stewart (21)
| Breanna Stewart (15)
| Sue Bird (7)
| Indiana Farmers ColiseumNo Fans
| 12–2
|- style="background:#fcc;"
| 15
| June 22
| Washington
| L 83–87
| Jewell Loyd (23)
| BirdStewart (8)
| Jewell Loyd (9)
| Angel of the Winds Arena2,495
| 12–3
|- style="background:#fcc;"
| 16
| June 27
| @ Las Vegas
| L 92–95 (OT)
| Breanna Stewart (35)
| RussellStewart (11)
| Sue Bird (6)
| Michelob Ultra Arena3,766
| 12–4

|- style="background:#cfc;"
| 17
| July 2
| Atlanta
| W 91–88
| Sue Bird (15)
| Mercedes Russell (7)
| Sue Bird (5)
| Angel of the Winds Arena3,011
| 13–4
|- style="background:#cfc;"
| 18
| July 4
| @ Los Angeles
| W 84–74
| Breanna Stewart (21)
| Ezi Magbegor (9)
| Jordin Canada (5)
| Los Angeles Convention Center716
| 14–4
|- style="background:#cfc;"
| 19
| July 7
| Los Angeles
| W 71–62
| Breanna Stewart (27)
| Breanna Stewart (11)
| Sue Bird (5)
| Angel of the Winds Arena2,730
| 15–4
|- style="background:#fcc;"
| 20
| July 9
| @ Phoenix
| L 77–85
| Jewell Loyd (16)
| Breanna Stewart (13)
| Sue Bird (5)
| Phoenix Suns Arena7,554
| 15–5
|- style="background:#cfc;"
| 21
| July 11
| Phoenix
| W 82–75
| Epiphanny Prince (15)
| Mercedes Russell (10)
| Jewell Loyd (6)
| Angel of the Winds Arena5,110
| 16–5

|- style="background:#cfc;"
| CC
| August 12
| vs. Connecticut
| W 79–57
| Breanna Stewart (17)
| Mercedes Russell (7)
| Sue Bird (5)
| Footprint Center5,006
| N/A
|- style="background:#fcc;"
| 22
| August 15
| @ Chicago
| L 85–87
| Jewell Loyd (26)
| Mercedes Russell (11)
| Mercedes Russell (7)
| Wintrust Arena6,231
| 16–6
|- style="background:#fcc;"
| 23
| August 18
| @ New York
| L 79–83
| Jewell Loyd (35)
| Stephanie Talbot (5)
| Jordin Canada (6)
| Barclays Center2,103
| 16–7
|- style="background:#cfc;"
| 24
| August 20
| @ New York
| W 99–83
| Jewell Loyd (29)
| Breanna Stewart (14)
| Sue Bird (6)
| Barclays Center3,889
| 17–7
|- style="background:#cfc;"
| 25
| August 22
| @ Washington
| W 85–78
| Breanna Stewart (20)
| Breanna Stewart (12)
| BirdTalbot (4)
| Entertainment and Sports Arena3,114
| 18–7
|- style="background:#fcc;"
| 26
| August 24
| @ Minnesota
| L 70–76
| Breanna Stewart (18)
| Breanna Stewart (16)
| Sue Bird (7)
| Target Center3,634
| 18–8
|- style="background:#fcc;"
| 27
| August 27
| Chicago
| L 69–73
| Breanna Stewart (18)
| Breanna Stewart (8)
| Sue Bird (4)
| Angel of the Winds Arena3,650
| 18–9
|- style="background:#fcc;"
| 28
| August 29
| Chicago
| L 75–107
| Breanna Stewart (19)
| Breanna Stewart (6)
| Sue Bird (7)
| Angel of the Winds Arena3,750
| 18–10

|- style="background:#cfc;"
| 29
| September 2
| New York
| W 85–75
| Breanna Stewart (33)
| Breanna Stewart (8)
| Breanna Stewart (5)
| Angel of the Winds Arena3,592
| 19–10
|- style="background:#cfc;"
| 30
| September 7
| Washington
| W 105–71
| Jewell Loyd (20)
| LoydMagbegor (6)
| Sue Bird (7)
| Angel of the Winds Arena2,390
| 20–10
|- style="background:#fcc;"
| 31
| September 12
| @ Los Angeles
| L 53–81
| Epiphanny Prince (12)
| Ezi Magbegor (6)
| Jewell Loyd (3)
| Staples Center4,181
| 20–11
|- style="background:#cfc;"
| 32
| September 17
| Phoenix
| W 94–85
| Jewell Loyd (37)
| Mercedes Russell (8)
| Sue Bird (7)
| Angel of the Winds Arena6,000
| 21–11

Playoffs 

|- style="background:#fcc;"
| 1
| September 26
| Phoenix
| 80–85 (OT)
| Katie Lou Samuelson (18)
| Mercedes Russell (12)
| BirdLoyd (5)
| Angel of the Winds Arena5,375
| 0–1

Standings

Playoffs

Statistics

Regular season

Awards and honors

References

External links 
 Official website of the Seattle Storm

Seattle Storm
Seattle Storm seasons
Seattle Storm
Seattle Storm